Broad Marston Halt railway station served the village of Pebworth, Worcestershire, England from 1904 to 1916 on the Gloucestershire Warwickshire Railway.

History 
The station opened as Broad Marston Halte on 17 October 1904 by the Great Western Railway. The spelling of the suffix 'halte' was later corrected to 'halt'. It initially had only one platform but a second one was added on 28 April 1907. The station closed on 14 July 1916, closing as a wartime economy measure but never opening again.

References

External links 

Disused railway stations in Worcestershire
Former Great Western Railway stations
Railway stations in Great Britain opened in 1904
Railway stations in Great Britain closed in 1916
1904 establishments in England
1916 disestablishments in England